Dan Mintz is an American filmmaker, producer and founder of global entertainment company, DMG Entertainment. Mintz has developed DMG Entertainment to house mega-blockbuster films, television shows, comic publishing, e-sports, virtual reality and live attractions. DMG Entertainment is headquartered in Beverly Hills, CA.

Career
Mintz was born in Staten Island, New York City and attended School of Performing Arts. Mintz started his career as a Commercial Director / Director of Photography shooting commercials for brands such as Volkswagen and Budweiser. His first feature film, Cookers won many awards including best film at the Milano International Film Festival. it also won best cinematography, best editing, and best music.

Mintz founded DMG Entertainment. It was under this umbrella that he grew a Commercial Production, Ad Agency, Media Agency, Event Agency, Feature Film Production and Distribution companies later taking them public. His visionary early roots in China gave him immense insight and value as he took his company public to a value of over 7 billion dollars.

As a Producer, Mintz has made films such as Iron Man 3, Looper, Point break, and Bloodshot.

He has worked on films with talent such as Robert Downey Jr., Johnny Depp, Vin Deisel, Bruce Wills, Emily Blunt, Morgan Freeman, Guy Pierce, Sir Ben Kingsley, Sir Anthony Hopkins, Rebecca Hall, Kate Mara, Ray Winstone, Don Cheadle, Gwyneth Paltrow, Edgar Ramirez, Joseph Gordon-Levitt, Jon Favreau, and James Cameron

Mintz has partnered with such major motion picture studios as Marvel, Disney, Warner Bros, Paramount, and Sony/Columbia.

DMG Entertainment 
Since the company’s development, Mintz has acquired several IP Universes such as Valiant Comics (founded in 1989 by former Marvel editor, Jim Shooter), Stormlight Archives (a series of novels written by Brandon Sanderson).

Mintz acquired the Valiant Comics universe in 2018 and has since formed deals with Sony and Paramount to produce a cinematic versions of characters such as Bloodshot, Faith, and Harbingers. Television shows based around Quantum and Woody and Dr. Mirage have also been announced.

(Mintz has since founded a gaming/next gen technology department under DMG Entertainment, making its debut with Brandon Sanderson’s Cosmere Universe as a virtual reality game. The game is called “The Way of Kings: Escape The Shattered Plains” and is based around Brandon Sanderson’s novel, “The Stormlight Archives”. The game was designed by the company Arcturus, Mintz has also partnered himself with e-sports league, Super League Gaming)

Hasbro and DMG have developed a Transformers Digital Family Entertainment Center called ‘Transfromers Next Gen Battle Center’ which will feature world class VR experiences.

References

American business executives
American film directors
American film producers
1965 births
Living people